Muhammad Ramzan Chhipa is a Pakistani philanthropist and social worker based in Karachi, Pakistan. 

He is the founder of Chhipa Welfare Association, an NGO in Pakistan known for its social work and the second largest fleet of ambulances after Edhi Foundation around the country. 

His welfare organization has a large fleet of over  500 Chhipa Ambulances, fully manned by Chhipa volunteers and equipped with first aid boxes and oxygen cylinders and are stationed at over 150 Chhipa Ambulance centers in prominent and vital places, on various city road roundabouts and near Government Hospitals across Karachi city and other regions of Pakistan, for providing immediate help and assistance to the needy, sick, suffering people and emergency patients. 

The 1987 Karachi car bombing at Bohri Bazaar led Ramzan Chhipa to found Chhipa Welfare Association.

Awards and recognition
 Sitara-i-Imtiaz (Star of Excellence) by the President of Pakistan in 2013 for his public service and social work.
 Gold Medal for Social Welfare Services by the Federation of Pakistan Chambers of Commerce & Industry (FPCCI) in 2013.
 Honorary Doctor of Letters degree by the University of Karachi and Governor of Sindh for his Social Welfare Services in 2014.

References

External links
official website of Chhipa Welfare Services

Pakistani social workers
Living people
Pakistani people of Gujarati descent
Pakistani philanthropists
People from Karachi
Recipients of Sitara-i-Imtiaz
Pakistani humanitarians
Pakistani pacifists
1971 births